Ionospheric Connection Explorer (ICON)  is a satellite designed to investigate changes in the ionosphere of Earth, the dynamic region high in our atmosphere where terrestrial weather from below meets space weather from above. ICON studies the interaction between Earth's weather systems and space weather driven by the Sun, and how this interaction drives turbulence in the upper atmosphere. It is hoped that a better understanding of this dynamic will mitigate its effects on communications, GPS signals, and technology in general. It is part of NASA's Explorer program and is operated by University of California, Berkeley's Space Sciences Laboratory.

On 12 April 2013, NASA announced that ICON, along with Global-scale Observations of the Limb and Disk (GOLD), had been selected for development with the cost capped at US$200 million, excluding launch costs. The principal investigator of ICON is Thomas Immel at the University of California, Berkeley.

ICON was originally scheduled to launch in June 2017 and was repeatedly delayed because of problems with its Pegasus XL launch vehicle. It was next due to launch on 26 October 2018 but the launch was rescheduled to 7 November 2018, and postponed again just 28 minutes before launch. ICON was successfully launched on 11 October 2019, at 02:00 UTC.

Overview 

ICON will perform a two-year mission to observe conditions in both the thermosphere and ionosphere. ICON is equipped with four instruments: a Michelson interferometer, built by the United States Naval Research Laboratory (NRL), measures the winds and temperatures in the thermosphere; an ion drift meter, built by University of Texas at Dallas, measures the motion of charged particles in the ionosphere; and two ultraviolet imagers built at University of California, Berkeley, observe the airglow layers in the upper atmosphere in order to determine both ionospheric and thermospheric density and composition.

Many low-Earth orbiting satellites, including the International Space Station (ISS), fly through the ionosphere and can be affected by its changing electric and magnetic fields. The ionosphere also acts as a conduit for many communications signals, such as radio waves and the signals that make GPS systems work. The ionosphere is where space weather manifests, creating unexpected conditions; electric currents can cause electrical charging of satellites, changing density can affect satellite orbits, and shifting magnetic fields can induce current in power systems, causing strain, disrupting communications and navigation or even triggering blackouts. Improved understanding of this environment can help predict such events and improve satellite safety and design.

Launch planning 
Upon initial completion and delivery of the ICON observatory in 2016, launch plans centered around the launch range at Kwajalein Atoll in the Pacific Ocean. ICON was originally scheduled to launch in June 2017, but was repeatedly delayed because of problems with its Pegasus XL launch vehicle. The launch vehicle was mated to its air-launch aircraft Stargazer for a launch attempt in June 2018. This launch was cancelled days before because the rocket showed issues on the first leg of the ferry flight to Kwajalein. Given the availability of the launch range in Cape Canaveral, and a review of the suitability of this site, it was adopted as the ICON launch site. The October 2018 launch from Florida was scheduled after an initial review of the avionics issues. Whereas the delays in 2017 were due to concerns with rocket-payload and fairing separation systems, the 2018 delays were due to noise in the rocket avionics systems. The issues resulted finally in the 2018 Cape Canaveral launch being scrubbed minutes before the scheduled launch. These issues were ultimately resolved and ICON launched from Cape Canaveral on 11 October 2019 at 02:00 UTC. After an approximately month-long commissioning period, ICON began sending back its first science data in November 2019.

Science payload 
ICON carries four scientific instruments designed to image even the faintest plasma or airglow to build up a picture of the ionosphere's density, composition and structure.

 Michelson Interferometer for Global High-Resolution Thermospheric Imaging (MIGHTI)
 Ion Velocity Meter (IVM) is an ion drift meter
 Extreme Ultra-Violet (EUV), an imager
 Far Ultra-Violet (FUV), an imager

MIGHTI was developed at the United States Naval Research Laboratory (NRL), IVM at the University of Texas, and EUV and FUV were developed at the University of California, Berkeley. The velocity measurements are gathered by observing the Doppler shift in the red and green lines of atomic oxygen. This is done with the Doppler Asymmetric Spatial Heterodyne (DASH) which uses échelle gratings. The temperature measurements are done by photometeric observations with a CCD.

IVM collects in situ data about ions in the local environment around the spacecraft, whereas EUV and FUV are spectrographic imagers. EUV is a 1-dimension limb imager designed to observe height and density of the daytime ionosphere by detecting the glow of oxygen ions and other species at wavelengths between 55 and 85 nm. FUV is a 2-dimension imager that observes the limb and below at 135 and 155 nm, where bright emissions of atomic oxygen and molecular nitrogen are found 

The solar panel produces 780 watts, but the observatory's power consumption ranges between 209 and 265 watts when in science mode.

Mission Operations 
Once launched, and for the duration of its two-year science mission, the ICON observatory is controlled and operated by the Mission Operations Center (MOC) at the Space Sciences Laboratory at University of California, Berkeley. The UCB MOC currently operates seven NASA satellites. ICON was placed into a 27.00° inclination orbit, and communications are through Tracking and Data Relay Satellite System (TDRSS), the orbiting NASA communications network. Ground contacts with ICON are performed mainly from the Berkeley Ground Station, an  dish, with backup contacts out of Wallops Flight Facility (WFF), Virginia and Santiago, Chile.

Loss of Contact 
The NASA ICON team lost contact with the ICON spacecraft on 25 November 2022. A fail-safe system designed to reset the spacecraft computer after 8 days with no receipt of commands from the ground failed to restore communications after it elapsed on 5 December 2022.

See also 

 Explorer program

References

External links 

 ICON website by NASA
 ICON website by University of California, Berkeley

Spacecraft launched in 2019
Explorers Program
NASA satellites orbiting Earth
2019 in the United States
Earth observation satellites of the United States
Spacecraft launched by Pegasus rockets
Geospace monitoring satellites